The Sun Also Shines at Night (and also known as Night Sun) is an Italian film directed by Paolo and Vittorio Taviani in 1990. It was screened out of competition at the 1990 Cannes Film Festival.

The plot is based on Leo Tolstoy's 1911 posthumously published short story "Father Sergius". The court of Czar Nicholas I is replaced by that of Charles III of Spain when he was still Charles VII  of Naples. All of the original Russian locations are replaced by  ones in southern Italy.

Cast
 Julian Sands as Sergio Giuramondo
 Charlotte Gainsbourg as Matilda
 Massimo Bonetti as Prince Santobuono
 Margarita Lozano as Sergio's Mother
 Patricia Millardet as Aurelia
 Rüdiger Vogler as King Charles
 Nastassja Kinski as Cristina Del Carpio
 Pamela Villoresi as Giuseppina Giuramondo
 Geppy Geijeses as Bishop (as Geppy Gleijeses)
 Sonia Gessner as Duchess Del Carpio
 Tony Sperandeo as Gesuino (as Gaetano Sperandeo)
 Matilde Piana as Peasant Woman
 Vittorio Capotorto as Matilda's Father
 Riccardo Parisio Perrotti as Duke Del Carpio (as Riccardo Parrisio Perrotti)
 Salvatore Rossi (actor) as Eugenio
 Teresa Brescianini as Concetta
 Biagio Barone as Father Biagio

References

External links

1990 films
1990 drama films
French drama films
German drama films
Italian drama films
West German films
1990s Italian-language films
Films based on works by Leo Tolstoy
Films directed by Paolo and Vittorio Taviani
Films set in Italy
Films set in the 1750s
Films shot in Matera
Films with screenplays by Tonino Guerra
1990s Italian films
1990s French films
1990s German films